Hornnes og Iveland is a former municipality in the old Nedenæs county in Norway.  The  municipality existed from 1838 until its dissolution in 1886. It included all of the present-day municipality of Iveland and the western half of the present-day municipality of Evje og Hornnes in the Setesdal region of Agder county. The administrative centre was the village of Hornnes where the Hornnes Church is located.  The other church in the municipality was the Iveland Church in the village of Birketveit.

History
The parish of Hordnæs og Iveland was established as a municipality on 1 January 1838 (see formannskapsdistrikt law). According to the 1835 census, the municipality had a population of 1,848. On 1 January 1886, Hornnes og Iveland was divided to create two separate municipalities: Hornnes (population: 1,113) and Iveland (population: 1,103). The municipality of Iveland still exists today, while Hornnes currently a part of the municipality of Evje og Hornnes.

Name
The municipality is an amalgamation of the names of two local parishes: Hornnes and Iveland.

The parish of Hornnes is named after an old Hornnes farm, since the first Hornnes Church was built there. The first element is horn which means "horn" and the last element is nes which means "headland".  So the meaning of Hornnes is "the headland shaped like a horn".

The parish of Iveland is named after the old Iveland farm, since the first Iveland Church was built there. The first element is the genitive case of the river name  (now called the Frøysåna) and the last element is land which means "land" or "farm". The old river name is probably derived from the Norse word  which means "yew" (Taxus baccata).

See also
List of former municipalities of Norway

References

External links

Iveland
Evje og Hornnes
Former municipalities of Norway
1838 establishments in Norway
1886 disestablishments in Norway